Ab Chenaru may refer to:
 Ab Chenaru, Fars
 Ab Chenaru, Kohgiluyeh and Boyer-Ahmad